The greenhouse millipede (Oxidus gracilis), also known as the hothouse millipede, short-flange millipede, or garden millipede, is a species of millipede in the family Paradoxosomatidae that has been widely introduced around the world, and is sometimes a pest in greenhouses.

Description
The dorsal section of each segment has a transverse groove, a trait found in most paradoxosomatids. They are brown in color with pale cream-colored legs and paranota (lateral "keels" extending from each segment).

Distribution
Greenhouse millipedes are thought to be native to Japan, but have been introduced globally. They are found in the tropics as well as temperate North and South America,North of Iran, and all of Europe.

References

External links

Polydesmida
Animals described in 1847
Millipedes of Asia
Millipedes of North America